The 2016 Colorado Rapids season is the club's 21st season of existence, and their 21st season in Major League Soccer, the top tier of the American and Canadian soccer pyramids.

The 2016 season was the Rapids' most successful regular season in franchise history. During the season, the Rapids finished 2nd in the Western Conference and 2nd overall in the regular season, besting their previous best regular season finish of 3rd in the Western Conference and 4th overall in 2002. The Rapids finished undefeated at home with a record of 11-0-6.  At home, they conceded only 7 goals, setting a new MLS record with a 0.41 goals-against average.  The season also featured a franchise-record 15 match unbeaten streak.  After finishing at the bottom of the table for the 2015, the season was hallmarked as a surprising turnaround. The team was bolstered by incoming transfer targets Tim Howard, Shkëlzen Gashi, Marco Pappa and Jermaine Jones. Outside of the regular season, the Rapids reached the fifth round of the U.S. Open Cup before falling to eventual champions, FC Dallas.
In the 2022 season, the Colorado Rapids did not make the playoffs. They finished four points off from playoffs and 10th in their conference. With the departures of Cole Bassett and Kellyn Acosta and the injuries of Jack Price and Braian Galvan, the team struggled during the 2022 season.

Background

Club

Transfers 

For transfers in, dates listed are when Colorado officially signed the players to the roster. Transactions where only the rights to the players are acquired are not listed. For transfers out, dates listed are when Colorado officially removed the players from its roster, not when they signed with another club. If a player later signed with another club, his new club will be noted, but the date listed here remains the one when he was officially removed from the Rapids roster.

In

Draft picks 

Draft picks are not automatically signed to the team roster. Only those who are signed to a contract will be listed as transfers in. Only trades involving draft picks and executed after the start of 2015 MLS SuperDraft will be listed in the notes.

Out

Loaned Out

Competitions

Preseason

MLS

MLS Cup Playoffs

Conference semifinals

Conference finals

U.S. Open Cup

Standings

Western Conference standings

Overall table 
Note: the table below has no impact on playoff qualification and is used solely for determining host of the MLS Cup, certain CCL spots, and 2016 MLS draft. The conference tables are the sole determinant for teams qualifying to the playoffs

Statistics

Goals and assists

References

Colorado Rapids seasons
Colorado Rapids
Colorado Rapids
Colorado Rapids